Malé Hradisko is a municipality and village in Prostějov District in the Olomouc Region of the Czech Republic. It has about 400 inhabitants.

Administrative parts
The village of Okluky is an administrative part of Malé Hradisko.

References

Villages in Prostějov District